Allentown, Pennsylvania is the home for the global and U.S. corporate headquarters of several companies, such as Air Products, PPL Corporation, Norfolk Southern Railway, and others. The largest employer in the Lehigh Valley is Lehigh Valley Health Network with almost 8,000 employees.

Tourism and activities 

The arrival of two professional athletics teams in the 21st century have bolstered the Allentown economy. In Center City Allentown, PPL Center, an 8,500-capacity indoor arena, opened in September 2014 as the new home for the Lehigh Valley Phantoms of the American Hockey League, the primary development team of the National Hockey League's Philadelphia Flyers. PPL Center also hosts major concerts and entertainment events. In East Allentown, Coca-Cola Park, a 10,178-capacity baseball stadium, opened in March 2008 as the new home for the Lehigh Valley IronPigs of the International League, the Triple-A-level Minor League affiliate of the Philadelphia Phillies of Major League Baseball.

Previously established attractions include the Allentown Art Museum, which completed a $15.4 million expansion projected in 2010-11, and the Baum School of Art, the city's primary art school. Several Allentown-based universities universities, including Cedar Crest College and Muhlenberg College, attract scholars and academics from all over the country.

Shopping
The city and its suburbs have several shopping malls, including Lehigh Valley Mall (the largest in the region) and Whitehall Mall, both located in Whitehall Township, South Mall on Lehigh Street in Salisbury Township, and The Promenade Shops at Saucon Valley in Center Valley.

Companies and corporations
The following is a list of corporations based in Allentown and the surrounding area:

Air Products (Trexlertown)
Buckeye Partners (U.S. headquarters) (Breinigsville)
Crayola (Easton)
Just Born (Bethlehem)
Lehigh Valley Hospital–Cedar Crest (Allentown)
Norfolk Southern Railway
Olympus (U.S. headquarters) (Center Valley)
PPL Corporation (Allentown)

Former corporations
The following is a list of companies formerly headquartered in Allentown and the surrounding area:

Bethlehem Steel
Hess's
Mack Trucks

See also
Allentown, Pennsylvania
Lehigh Valley

References

 
Allentown
Allentown, Pennsylvania